Desulfoluna  is a bacteria genus from the order Desulfobacterales.

References

Further reading 
 Peng P, Goris T, Lu Y, Nijsse B, Burrichter A, Schleheck D, Koehorst JJ, Liu J, Sipkema D, Sinninghe-Damste JS, Stams AJM, Häggblom MM, Smidt H, Atashgahi S (2020). Organohalide-respiring Desulfoluna species isolated from marine environments. The ISME Journal. 14 815-827. doi.org/10.1038/s41396-019-0573-y. PMID: 31896791
 
 

Desulfobacterales
Bacteria genera